Francisco Caracciolo Urreta Visayas de Gainza (3 June 1818 – 31 July 1879) was the 25th bishop of the Diocese of Nueva Cáceres. He was born in the city of Calahorra, in the province of Logroño, Spain.

He studied in the Philippines and lived in Manila. In Manila he was a professor at the Colegio of Santo Tomas. Gaínza and his friend, Father Pedro Peláez from Laguna, were leaders of the secularization movement, seeking reforms within the Catholic Church to respect the rights of the secular clergy, who were mostly natives, in parishes. Together with Peláez, they founded in 1861 El Católico Filipino, the first Catholic newspaper in the Philippines.

In March 1862, Gaínza was appointed the bishop of the Diocese of Nueva Cáceres. After Peláez's death from the 3 June 1863 earthquake, Gaínza dispelled rumors of Peláez's unfulfilled plans of rebellion against Spain.

References

Bikol Annals. Domingo Abella. 1954. p. 171-180.
"The Diocesan Seminary". Sarong artikulo sinurat ni Agapito Sacristan,C.M., Rector, na nagluwas sa Peñafrancia Official Souvenir Program (Sept. 1941).
An retrato niya sinapi' sa libro ni Abella na Bikol Annals asin pinadakula sa kompyuter.

External links
Catholic-Hierarchy.com Website 

1818 births
1879 deaths
Spanish academics
Spanish expatriate bishops
Roman Catholic bishops of Cáceres
Academic staff of the University of Santo Tomas